This is the results breakdown of the 2021 Portuguese local elections for the Municipal Councils held on 26 September 2021. The following tables show detailed results  in all district capitals, as well as in municipalities above 100,000 inhabitants.

Results by City

Almada

|-
| colspan="11" style="text-align:center;" | 
|-
! rowspan="2" colspan=2 style="background-color:#E9E9E9" align=left|Parties
! rowspan="2" style="background-color:#E9E9E9" align=right|Votes
! rowspan="2" style="background-color:#E9E9E9" align=right|%
! rowspan="2" style="background-color:#E9E9E9" align=right|±pp swing
! colspan="2" style="background-color:#E9E9E9" align="center"|Councillors
|- style="background-color:#E9E9E9"
! style="background-color:#E9E9E9" align="center"|Total
! style="background-color:#E9E9E9" align="center"|±
|-
| 
|28,203||39.87||8.4||5||1
|-
| 
|21,006||29.69||1.1||4||0
|-
|style="width: 9px" bgcolor= align="center" | 
|align=left|PSD / CDS–PP / Alliance / MPT / PPM
|7,574||10.71||5.9||1||1
|-
| 
|4,834||6.83||2.8||1||0
|-
|style="width: 9px" bgcolor=#202056 align="center" | 
|align=left|CHEGA
|3,980||5.63||||0||
|-
| 
|1,617||2.29||1.6||0||0
|-
|style="width: 9px" bgcolor=#00ADEF align="center" | 
|align=left|Liberal Initiative
|1,391||1.97||||0||
|-
|colspan=2 width="330" align=left style="background-color:#E9E9E9"|Total valid
|width="50" align="right" style="background-color:#E9E9E9"|68,605
|width="40" align="right" style="background-color:#E9E9E9"|96.98
|width="40" align="right" style="background-color:#E9E9E9"|2.0
|width="40" align="right" style="background-color:#E9E9E9"|11
|width="40" align="right" style="background-color:#E9E9E9"|0
|-
|colspan=2|Blank ballots
|1,324||1.87||1.0||colspan=3 rowspan=4|
|-
|colspan=2|Invalid ballots
|814||1.15||1.0
|-
|colspan=2 align=left style="background-color:#E9E9E9"|Total
|width="50" align="right" style="background-color:#E9E9E9"|70,743
|width="40" align="right" style="background-color:#E9E9E9"|100.00
|width="40" align="right" style="background-color:#E9E9E9"|
|-
|colspan=2|Registered voters/turnout
||151,953||46.56||2.3
|-
| colspan=11 align=left | Source: Almada 2021 election results
|-
|style="width: 9px" bgcolor= align="center" | 
|align="left" colspan="6"|Socialist hold
|}

Amadora

|-
| colspan="11" style="text-align:center;" | 
|-
! rowspan="2" colspan=2 style="background-color:#E9E9E9" align=left|Parties
! rowspan="2" style="background-color:#E9E9E9" align=right|Votes
! rowspan="2" style="background-color:#E9E9E9" align=right|%
! rowspan="2" style="background-color:#E9E9E9" align=right|±pp swing
! colspan="2" style="background-color:#E9E9E9" align="center"|Councillors
|- style="background-color:#E9E9E9"
! style="background-color:#E9E9E9" align="center"|Total
! style="background-color:#E9E9E9" align="center"|±
|-
| 
|27,221||43.88||4.1||7||0
|-
|style="width: 9px" bgcolor= align="center" | 
|align=left|PSD / CDS–PP / Alliance / MPT / PDR
|15,230||24.55||6.5||3||1
|-
| 
|6,162||9.93||2.3||1||0
|-
|style="width: 9px" bgcolor=#202056 align="center" | 
|align=left|CHEGA
|3,375||5.44||||0||
|-
| 
|3,305||5.33||1.6||0||1
|-
| 
|1,933||3.12||0.1||0||0
|-
|style="width: 9px" bgcolor=#00ADEF align="center" | 
|align=left|Liberal Initiative
|1,729||2.79||||0||
|-
|style="width: 9px" bgcolor=#005FAD align="center" | 
|align=left|People's Monarchist / React, Include, Recycle 
|377||0.61||||0||
|-
|style="width: 9px" bgcolor=crimson align="center" | 
|align=left|Socialist Alternative Movement
|227||0.37||||0||
|- 
|colspan=2 width="330" align=left style="background-color:#E9E9E9"|Total valid
|width="50" align="right" style="background-color:#E9E9E9"|59,559
|width="40" align="right" style="background-color:#E9E9E9"|96.00
|width="40" align="right" style="background-color:#E9E9E9"|1.8
|width="40" align="right" style="background-color:#E9E9E9"|11
|width="40" align="right" style="background-color:#E9E9E9"|0
|-
|colspan=2|Blank ballots
|1,469||2.37||1.1||colspan=3 rowspan=4|
|-
|colspan=2|Invalid ballots
|1,010||1.63||0.7
|-
|colspan=2 align=left style="background-color:#E9E9E9"|Total
|width="50" align="right" style="background-color:#E9E9E9"|62,038
|width="40" align="right" style="background-color:#E9E9E9"|100.00
|width="40" align="right" style="background-color:#E9E9E9"|
|-
|colspan=2|Registered voters/turnout
||145,310||42.69||0.0
|-
| colspan=11 align=left | Source: Amadora 2021 election results
|-
|style="width: 9px" bgcolor= align="center" | 
|align="left" colspan="6"|Socialist hold
|}

Aveiro

|-
| colspan="11" style="text-align:center;" | 
|-
! rowspan="2" colspan=2 style="background-color:#E9E9E9" align=left|Parties
! rowspan="2" style="background-color:#E9E9E9" align=right|Votes
! rowspan="2" style="background-color:#E9E9E9" align=right|%
! rowspan="2" style="background-color:#E9E9E9" align=right|±pp swing
! colspan="2" style="background-color:#E9E9E9" align="center"|Councillors
|- style="background-color:#E9E9E9"
! style="background-color:#E9E9E9" align="center"|Total
! style="background-color:#E9E9E9" align="center"|±
|-
|style="width: 9px" bgcolor= align="center" | 
|align=left|PSD / CDS–PP / PPM
|17,549||51.26||2.7||6||0
|-
|style="width: 9px" bgcolor=#FF66FF align="center" |
|align=left|Socialist / People–Animals–Nature
|8,901||26.00||5.0||3||0
|-
| 
|2,191||6.40||0.4||0||0
|-
|style="width: 9px" bgcolor=#202056 align="center" | 
|align=left|CHEGA
|1,383||4.04||||0||
|-
| 
|1,144||3.34||0.7||0||0
|-
|style="width: 9px" bgcolor=#00ADEF align="center" | 
|align=left|Liberal Initiative
|790||2.31||||0||
|-
|style="width: 9px" bgcolor=gold align="center" | 
|align=left|We, the Citizens! 
|358||1.05||||0||
|-
| 
|92||0.27||||0||
|- 
|colspan=2 width="330" align=left style="background-color:#E9E9E9"|Total valid
|width="50" align="right" style="background-color:#E9E9E9"|32,408
|width="40" align="right" style="background-color:#E9E9E9"|94.66
|width="40" align="right" style="background-color:#E9E9E9"|1.0
|width="40" align="right" style="background-color:#E9E9E9"|9
|width="40" align="right" style="background-color:#E9E9E9"|0
|-
|colspan=2|Blank ballots
|1,235||3.61||0.6||colspan=3 rowspan=4|
|-
|colspan=2|Invalid ballots
|594||1.73||0.5
|-
|colspan=2 align=left style="background-color:#E9E9E9"|Total
|width="50" align="right" style="background-color:#E9E9E9"|34,237
|width="40" align="right" style="background-color:#E9E9E9"|100.00
|width="40" align="right" style="background-color:#E9E9E9"|
|-
|colspan=2|Registered voters/turnout
||70,541||48.53||0.6
|-
| colspan=11 align=left | Source: Aveiro 2021 election results
|-
|style="width: 9px" bgcolor= align="center" | 
|align="left" colspan="6"|PSD / CDS–PP / PPM hold
|}

Barcelos

|-
| colspan="11" style="text-align:center;" | 
|-
! rowspan="2" colspan=2 style="background-color:#E9E9E9" align=left|Parties
! rowspan="2" style="background-color:#E9E9E9" align=right|Votes
! rowspan="2" style="background-color:#E9E9E9" align=right|%
! rowspan="2" style="background-color:#E9E9E9" align=right|±pp swing
! colspan="2" style="background-color:#E9E9E9" align="center"|Councillors
|- style="background-color:#E9E9E9"
! style="background-color:#E9E9E9" align="center"|Total
! style="background-color:#E9E9E9" align="center"|±
|-
|style="width: 9px" bgcolor= align="center" | 
|align=left|Social Democratic / People's
|33,753||45.39||12.6||6||2
|-
| 
|27,633||37.16||4.0||5||0
|-
|style="width: 8px" bgcolor=gray align="center" | 
|align=left|All Barcelos (TB)
|3,323||4.47||||0||
|-
|style="width: 9px" bgcolor=#202056 align="center" | 
|align=left|CHEGA
|2,780||3.74||||0||
|-
| 
|1,688||2.27||0.4||0||0
|-
| 
|1,243||1.67||0.2||0||0
|-
|style="width: 9px" bgcolor=crimson align="center" | 
|align=left|Socialist Alternative Movement
|511||0.69||0.5||0||0
|- 
|colspan=2 width="330" align=left style="background-color:#E9E9E9"|Total valid
|width="50" align="right" style="background-color:#E9E9E9"|70,931
|width="40" align="right" style="background-color:#E9E9E9"|95.38
|width="40" align="right" style="background-color:#E9E9E9"|1.0
|width="40" align="right" style="background-color:#E9E9E9"|11
|width="40" align="right" style="background-color:#E9E9E9"|0
|-
|colspan=2|Blank ballots
|2,304||3.10||0.9||colspan=3 rowspan=4|
|-
|colspan=2|Invalid ballots
|1,133||1.52||0.1
|-
|colspan=2 align=left style="background-color:#E9E9E9"|Total
|width="50" align="right" style="background-color:#E9E9E9"|74,368
|width="40" align="right" style="background-color:#E9E9E9"|100.00
|width="40" align="right" style="background-color:#E9E9E9"|
|-
|colspan=2|Registered voters/turnout
||106,239||70.00||1.7
|-
| colspan=11 align=left | Source: Barcelos 2021 election results
|-
|style="width: 9px" bgcolor= align="center" | 
|colspan="6" align=left|Social Democratic / People's gain from Socialist
|}

Beja

|-
| colspan="11" style="text-align:center;" | 
|-
! rowspan="2" colspan=2 style="background-color:#E9E9E9" align=left|Parties
! rowspan="2" style="background-color:#E9E9E9" align=right|Votes
! rowspan="2" style="background-color:#E9E9E9" align=right|%
! rowspan="2" style="background-color:#E9E9E9" align=right|±pp swing
! colspan="2" style="background-color:#E9E9E9" align="center"|Councillors
|- style="background-color:#E9E9E9"
! style="background-color:#E9E9E9" align="center"|Total
! style="background-color:#E9E9E9" align="center"|±
|-
| 
|6,336||39.14||7.1||3||1
|-
| 
|5,371||32.84||4.8||3||0
|-
|style="width: 9px" bgcolor= align="center" | 
|align=left|PSD / CDS–PP / PPM / IL / Alliance
|3,000||18.53||10.0||1||1
|-
|style="width: 9px" bgcolor=#202056 align="center" | 
|align=left|CHEGA
|880||5.44||||0||
|-
| 
|274||1.69||1.7||0||0
|-
|colspan=2 width="330" align=left style="background-color:#E9E9E9"|Total valid
|width="50" align="right" style="background-color:#E9E9E9"|15,807
|width="40" align="right" style="background-color:#E9E9E9"|97.64
|width="40" align="right" style="background-color:#E9E9E9"|1.8
|width="40" align="right" style="background-color:#E9E9E9"|7
|width="40" align="right" style="background-color:#E9E9E9"|0
|-
|colspan=2|Blank ballots
|230||1.42||1.1||colspan=3 rowspan=4|
|-
|colspan=2|Invalid ballots
|152||0.94||0.7
|-
|colspan=2 align=left style="background-color:#E9E9E9"|Total
|width="50" align="right" style="background-color:#E9E9E9"|16,189
|width="40" align="right" style="background-color:#E9E9E9"|100.00
|width="40" align="right" style="background-color:#E9E9E9"|
|-
|colspan=2|Registered voters/turnout
||28,777||56.26||0.3
|-
| colspan=11 align=left | Source: Beja 2021 election results
|-
|style="width: 9px" bgcolor= align="center" | 
|align="left" colspan="6"|Socialist hold
|}

Braga

|-
| colspan="11" style="text-align:center;" | 
|-
! rowspan="2" colspan=2 style="background-color:#E9E9E9" align=left|Parties
! rowspan="2" style="background-color:#E9E9E9" align=right|Votes
! rowspan="2" style="background-color:#E9E9E9" align=right|%
! rowspan="2" style="background-color:#E9E9E9" align=right|±pp swing
! colspan="2" style="background-color:#E9E9E9" align="center"|Councillors
|- style="background-color:#E9E9E9"
! style="background-color:#E9E9E9" align="center"|Total
! style="background-color:#E9E9E9" align="center"|±
|-
|style="width: 9px" bgcolor= align="center" | 
|align=left|PSD / CDS–PP / PPM / Alliance
|40,585||42.89||9.2||6||1
|-
| 
|29,042||30.69||2.8||4||1
|-
| 
|6,363||6.72||2.9||1||0
|-
|style="width: 9px" bgcolor=#202056 align="center" | 
|align=left|CHEGA
|4,411||4.66||||0||
|-
| 
|3,974||4.20||0.6||0||0
|-
|style="width: 9px" bgcolor=#00ADEF align="center" | 
|align=left|Liberal Initiative
|2,766||2.92||||0||
|-
| 
|2,593||2.74||||0||
|-
| 
|573||0.61||||0||
|- 
|colspan=2 width="330" align=left style="background-color:#E9E9E9"|Total valid
|width="50" align="right" style="background-color:#E9E9E9"|90,307
|width="40" align="right" style="background-color:#E9E9E9"|95.44
|width="40" align="right" style="background-color:#E9E9E9"|0.2
|width="40" align="right" style="background-color:#E9E9E9"|11
|width="40" align="right" style="background-color:#E9E9E9"|0
|-
|colspan=2|Blank ballots
|3,009||3.18||0.4||colspan=3 rowspan=4|
|-
|colspan=2|Invalid ballots
|1,305||1.38||0.2
|-
|colspan=2 align=left style="background-color:#E9E9E9"|Total
|width="50" align="right" style="background-color:#E9E9E9"|94,621
|width="40" align="right" style="background-color:#E9E9E9"|100.00
|width="40" align="right" style="background-color:#E9E9E9"|
|-
|colspan=2|Registered voters/turnout
||166,180||56.94||0.7
|-
| colspan=11 align=left | Source: Braga 2021 election results
|-
|style="width: 9px" bgcolor= align="center" | 
|align="left" colspan="6"|PSD / CDS–PP / PPM / Alliance hold
|}

Bragança

|-
| colspan="11" style="text-align:center;" | 
|-
! rowspan="2" colspan=2 style="background-color:#E9E9E9" align=left|Parties
! rowspan="2" style="background-color:#E9E9E9" align=right|Votes
! rowspan="2" style="background-color:#E9E9E9" align=right|%
! rowspan="2" style="background-color:#E9E9E9" align=right|±pp swing
! colspan="2" style="background-color:#E9E9E9" align="center"|Councillors
|- style="background-color:#E9E9E9"
! style="background-color:#E9E9E9" align="center"|Total
! style="background-color:#E9E9E9" align="center"|±
|-
| 
|10,307||57.51||0.5||5||0
|-
| 
|4,836||26.98||0.1||2||0
|-
|style="width: 9px" bgcolor=#202056 align="center" | 
|align=left|CHEGA
|1,055||5.89||||0||
|-
| 
|398||2.22||0.1||0||0
|-
| 
|249||1.39||2.8||0||0
|-
| 
|237||1.32||1.4||0||0
|-
|colspan=2 width="330" align=left style="background-color:#E9E9E9"|Total valid
|width="50" align="right" style="background-color:#E9E9E9"|17,082
|width="40" align="right" style="background-color:#E9E9E9"|95.31
|width="40" align="right" style="background-color:#E9E9E9"|0.4
|width="40" align="right" style="background-color:#E9E9E9"|7
|width="40" align="right" style="background-color:#E9E9E9"|0
|-
|colspan=2|Blank ballots
|531||2.96||0.1||colspan=3 rowspan=4|
|-
|colspan=2|Invalid ballots
|310||1.73||0.5
|-
|colspan=2 align=left style="background-color:#E9E9E9"|Total
|width="50" align="right" style="background-color:#E9E9E9"|17,923
|width="40" align="right" style="background-color:#E9E9E9"|100.00
|width="40" align="right" style="background-color:#E9E9E9"|
|-
|colspan=2|Registered voters/turnout
||35,426||50.59||2.0
|-
| colspan=11 align=left | Source: Bragança 2021 election results
|-
|style="width: 9px" bgcolor= align="center" | 
|align="left" colspan="6"|Social Democratic hold
|}

Cascais

|-
| colspan="11" style="text-align:center;" | 
|-
! rowspan="2" colspan=2 style="background-color:#E9E9E9" align=left|Parties
! rowspan="2" style="background-color:#E9E9E9" align=right|Votes
! rowspan="2" style="background-color:#E9E9E9" align=right|%
! rowspan="2" style="background-color:#E9E9E9" align=right|±pp swing
! colspan="2" style="background-color:#E9E9E9" align="center"|Councillors
|- style="background-color:#E9E9E9"
! style="background-color:#E9E9E9" align="center"|Total
! style="background-color:#E9E9E9" align="center"|±
|-
|style="width: 9px" bgcolor= align="center" | 
|align=left|Social Democratic / People's
|41,962||52.55||6.6||7||1
|-
|style="width: 9px" bgcolor=#FF66FF align="center" |
|align=left|Socialist / People–Animals–Nature / LIVRE
|17,265||21.62||12.0||3||1
|-
|style="width: 9px" bgcolor=#202056 align="center" | 
|align=left|CHEGA
|5,927||7.42||||1||
|-
| 
|4,304||5.39||2.1||0||1
|-
|style="width: 9px" bgcolor=#00ADEF align="center" | 
|align=left|Liberal Initiative
|3,468||4.34||||0||
|-
| 
|2,919||3.66||1.6||0||0
|-
|style="width: 9px" bgcolor=gold align="center" | 
|align=left|We, the Citizens! / People's Monarchist
|1,471||1.84||||0||
|- 
|colspan=2 width="330" align=left style="background-color:#E9E9E9"|Total valid
|width="50" align="right" style="background-color:#E9E9E9"|77,316
|width="40" align="right" style="background-color:#E9E9E9"|96.82
|width="40" align="right" style="background-color:#E9E9E9"|1.8
|width="40" align="right" style="background-color:#E9E9E9"|11
|width="40" align="right" style="background-color:#E9E9E9"|0
|-
|colspan=2|Blank ballots
|1,569||1.96||1.2||colspan=3 rowspan=4|
|-
|colspan=2|Invalid ballots
|973||1.22||0.6
|-
|colspan=2 align=left style="background-color:#E9E9E9"|Total
|width="50" align="right" style="background-color:#E9E9E9"|79,858
|width="40" align="right" style="background-color:#E9E9E9"|100.00
|width="40" align="right" style="background-color:#E9E9E9"|
|-
|colspan=2|Registered voters/turnout
||179,237||44.55||1.0
|-
| colspan=11 align=left | Source: Cascais 2021 election results
|-
|style="width: 9px" bgcolor= align="center" | 
|align="left" colspan="6"|Social Democratic / People's hold
|}

Castelo Branco

|-
| colspan="11" style="text-align:center;" | 
|-
! rowspan="2" colspan=2 style="background-color:#E9E9E9" align=left|Parties
! rowspan="2" style="background-color:#E9E9E9" align=right|Votes
! rowspan="2" style="background-color:#E9E9E9" align=right|%
! rowspan="2" style="background-color:#E9E9E9" align=right|±pp swing
! colspan="2" style="background-color:#E9E9E9" align="center"|Councillors
|- style="background-color:#E9E9E9"
! style="background-color:#E9E9E9" align="center"|Total
! style="background-color:#E9E9E9" align="center"|±
|-
| 
|9,813||35.95||22.8||3||2
|-
|style="width: 8px" bgcolor=gray align="center" | 
|align=left|Always - Independent Movement (S-MI)
|8,638||31.65||||3||
|-
|style="width: 9px" bgcolor= align="center" | 
|align=left|PSD / CDS–PP / PPM
|3,131||11.47||15.2||1||1
|-
|style="width: 9px" bgcolor=#202056 align="center" | 
|align=left|CHEGA
|1,961||7.18||||0||
|-
| 
|1,606||5.88||||0||
|-
| 
|590||2.16||2.3||0||0
|-
| 
|446||1.63||2.9||0||0
|-
|colspan=2 width="330" align=left style="background-color:#E9E9E9"|Total valid
|width="50" align="right" style="background-color:#E9E9E9"|26,185
|width="40" align="right" style="background-color:#E9E9E9"|95.93
|width="40" align="right" style="background-color:#E9E9E9"|1.5
|width="40" align="right" style="background-color:#E9E9E9"|7
|width="40" align="right" style="background-color:#E9E9E9"|0
|-
|colspan=2|Blank ballots
|653||2.39||0.9||colspan=3 rowspan=4|
|-
|colspan=2|Invalid ballots
|457||1.67||0.6
|-
|colspan=2 align=left style="background-color:#E9E9E9"|Total
|width="50" align="right" style="background-color:#E9E9E9"|27,295
|width="40" align="right" style="background-color:#E9E9E9"|100.00
|width="40" align="right" style="background-color:#E9E9E9"|
|-
|colspan=2|Registered voters/turnout
||48,441||56.35||2.9
|-
| colspan=11 align=left | Source: Castelo Branco 2021 election results
|-
|style="width: 9px" bgcolor= align="center" | 
|align="left" colspan="6"|Socialist hold
|}

Coimbra

|-
| colspan="11" style="text-align:center;" | 
|-
! rowspan="2" colspan=2 style="background-color:#E9E9E9" align=left|Parties
! rowspan="2" style="background-color:#E9E9E9" align=right|Votes
! rowspan="2" style="background-color:#E9E9E9" align=right|%
! rowspan="2" style="background-color:#E9E9E9" align=right|±pp swing
! colspan="2" style="background-color:#E9E9E9" align="center"|Councillors
|- style="background-color:#E9E9E9"
! style="background-color:#E9E9E9" align="center"|Total
! style="background-color:#E9E9E9" align="center"|±
|-
|style="width: 9px" bgcolor= align="center" | 
|align=left|PSD / CDS–PP / NC / PPM / Alliance / RIR / Volt
|29,349||43.92||17.3||6||3
|-
| 
|21,820||32.65||2.8||4||1
|-
| 
|5,022||7.51||0.8||1||0
|-
|style="width: 8px" bgcolor=gray align="center" | 
|align=left|Citizens for Coimbra (CpC)
|4,201||6.29||0.7||0||0
|-
|style="width: 9px" bgcolor=#202056 align="center" | 
|align=left|CHEGA
|1,529||2.29||||0||
|-
|style="width: 9px" bgcolor=#00ADEF align="center" | 
|align=left|Liberal Initiative
|1,111||1.66||||0||
|-
| 
|968||1.45||0.1||0||0
|-
|style="width: 9px" bgcolor=black align="center" | 
|align=left|Democratic Republican / Earth
|144||0.22||||0||
|-
|colspan=2 width="330" align=left style="background-color:#E9E9E9"|Total valid
|width="50" align="right" style="background-color:#E9E9E9"|64,144
|width="40" align="right" style="background-color:#E9E9E9"|95.98
|width="40" align="right" style="background-color:#E9E9E9"|0.7
|width="40" align="right" style="background-color:#E9E9E9"|11
|width="40" align="right" style="background-color:#E9E9E9"|0
|-
|colspan=2|Blank ballots
|1,948||2.91||0.1||colspan=3 rowspan=4|
|-
|colspan=2|Invalid ballots
|739||1.11||0.5
|-
|colspan=2 align=left style="background-color:#E9E9E9"|Total
|width="50" align="right" style="background-color:#E9E9E9"|66,831
|width="40" align="right" style="background-color:#E9E9E9"|100.00
|width="40" align="right" style="background-color:#E9E9E9"|
|-
|colspan=2|Registered voters/turnout
||126,293||52.92||0.5
|-
| colspan=11 align=left | Source: Coimbra 2021 election results
|-
|style="width: 9px" bgcolor= align="center" | 
|colspan="6" align=left|PSD / CDS–PP / NC / PPM / Alliance / RIR / Volt gain from Socialist
|}

Évora

|-
| colspan="11" style="text-align:center;" | 
|-
! rowspan="2" colspan=2 style="background-color:#E9E9E9" align=left|Parties
! rowspan="2" style="background-color:#E9E9E9" align=right|Votes
! rowspan="2" style="background-color:#E9E9E9" align=right|%
! rowspan="2" style="background-color:#E9E9E9" align=right|±pp swing
! colspan="2" style="background-color:#E9E9E9" align="center"|Councillors
|- style="background-color:#E9E9E9"
! style="background-color:#E9E9E9" align="center"|Total
! style="background-color:#E9E9E9" align="center"|±
|-
| 
|6,413||27.44||13.1||2||2
|-
| 
|6,140||26.39||0.1||2||0
|-
|style="width: 9px" bgcolor= align="center" | 
|align=left|PSD / CDS–PP / MPT / PPM
|4,458||19.07||1.7||2||1
|-
|style="width: 9px" bgcolor=gold align="center" | 
|align=left|We, the Citizens! / React, Include, Recycle
|2,972||12.71||||1||
|-
|style="width: 9px" bgcolor=#202056 align="center" | 
|align=left|CHEGA
|1,591||6.81||||0||
|-
| 
|888||3.80||1.0||0||0
|-
|colspan=2 width="330" align=left style="background-color:#E9E9E9"|Total valid
|width="50" align="right" style="background-color:#E9E9E9"|22,462
|width="40" align="right" style="background-color:#E9E9E9"|96.10
|width="40" align="right" style="background-color:#E9E9E9"|1.5
|width="40" align="right" style="background-color:#E9E9E9"|7
|width="40" align="right" style="background-color:#E9E9E9"|0
|-
|colspan=2|Blank ballots
|614||2.63||0.9||colspan=3 rowspan=4|
|-
|colspan=2|Invalid ballots
|298||1.27||0.7
|-
|colspan=2 align=left style="background-color:#E9E9E9"|Total
|width="50" align="right" style="background-color:#E9E9E9"|23,374
|width="40" align="right" style="background-color:#E9E9E9"|100.00
|width="40" align="right" style="background-color:#E9E9E9"|
|-
|colspan=2|Registered voters/turnout
||46,895||49.84||0.9
|-
| colspan=11 align=left | Source: Évora 2021 election results
|-
|style="width: 9px" bgcolor= align="center" | 
|align="left" colspan="6"|Unitary Democratic Coalition hold
|}

Faro

|-
| colspan="11" style="text-align:center;" | 
|-
! rowspan="2" colspan=2 style="background-color:#E9E9E9" align=left|Parties
! rowspan="2" style="background-color:#E9E9E9" align=right|Votes
! rowspan="2" style="background-color:#E9E9E9" align=right|%
! rowspan="2" style="background-color:#E9E9E9" align=right|±pp swing
! colspan="2" style="background-color:#E9E9E9" align="center"|Councillors
|- style="background-color:#E9E9E9"
! style="background-color:#E9E9E9" align="center"|Total
! style="background-color:#E9E9E9" align="center"|±
|-
|style="width: 9px" bgcolor= align="center" | 
|align=left|PSD / CDS–PP / IL / MPT / PPM
|12,195||47.76||3.8||6||1
|-
| 
|7,809||30.58||7.5||3||1
|-
| 
|1,656||6.48||0.9||0||0
|-
|style="width: 9px" bgcolor=#202056 align="center" | 
|align=left|CHEGA
|1,311||5.13||||0||
|-
| 
|1,035||2.66||0.4||0||0
|-
| 
|678||2.66||0.4||0||0
|-
|colspan=2 width="330" align=left style="background-color:#E9E9E9"|Total valid
|width="50" align="right" style="background-color:#E9E9E9"|24,684
|width="40" align="right" style="background-color:#E9E9E9"|96.66
|width="40" align="right" style="background-color:#E9E9E9"|0.1
|width="40" align="right" style="background-color:#E9E9E9"|9
|width="40" align="right" style="background-color:#E9E9E9"|0
|-
|colspan=2|Blank ballots
|558||2.19||0.1||colspan=3 rowspan=4|
|-
|colspan=2|Invalid ballots
|294||1.15||0.2
|-
|colspan=2 align=left style="background-color:#E9E9E9"|Total
|width="50" align="right" style="background-color:#E9E9E9"|25,536
|width="40" align="right" style="background-color:#E9E9E9"|100.00
|width="40" align="right" style="background-color:#E9E9E9"|
|-
|colspan=2|Registered voters/turnout
||56,855||44.91||0.4
|-
| colspan=11 align=left | Source: Faro 2021 election results
|-
|style="width: 9px" bgcolor= align="center" | 
|align="left" colspan="6"|PSD / CDS–PP / IL / MPT / PPM hold
|}

Funchal

|-
| colspan="11" style="text-align:center;" | 
|-
! rowspan="2" colspan=2 style="background-color:#E9E9E9" align=left|Parties
! rowspan="2" style="background-color:#E9E9E9" align=right|Votes
! rowspan="2" style="background-color:#E9E9E9" align=right|%
! rowspan="2" style="background-color:#E9E9E9" align=right|±pp swing
! colspan="2" style="background-color:#E9E9E9" align="center"|Councillors
|- style="background-color:#E9E9E9"
! style="background-color:#E9E9E9" align="center"|Total
! style="background-color:#E9E9E9" align="center"|±
|-
|style="width: 9px" bgcolor= align="center" | 
|align=left|Social Democratic / People's
|26,841||46.98||6.4||6||1
|-
|style="width: 9px" bgcolor= align="center" |
|align=left|PS / BE / PAN / MPT / PDR
|22,694||39.72||2.3||5||1
|-
| 
|1,647||2.88||0.7||0||0
|-
|style="width: 9px" bgcolor=#202056 align="center" | 
|align=left|CHEGA
|1,476||2.58||||0||
|-
|style="width: 9px" bgcolor=green align="center" | 
|align=left|Together for the People 
|974||1.70||||0||
|-
|style="width: 9px" bgcolor=#00ADEF align="center" | 
|align=left|Liberal Initiative
|720||1.26||||0||
|-
|style="width: 10px" bgcolor=#CC0033 align="center" | 
|align=left|Labour
|639||1.12||0.4||0||0
|-
| 
|257||0.45||||0||
|- 
| 
|251||0.44||1.9||0||0
|- 
|colspan=2 width="330" align=left style="background-color:#E9E9E9"|Total valid
|width="50" align="right" style="background-color:#E9E9E9"|55,499
|width="40" align="right" style="background-color:#E9E9E9"|97.14
|width="40" align="right" style="background-color:#E9E9E9"|1.3
|width="40" align="right" style="background-color:#E9E9E9"|11
|width="40" align="right" style="background-color:#E9E9E9"|0
|-
|colspan=2|Blank ballots
|478||0.84||0.4||colspan=3 rowspan=4|
|-
|colspan=2|Invalid ballots
|1,158||2.03||0.9
|-
|colspan=2 align=left style="background-color:#E9E9E9"|Total
|width="50" align="right" style="background-color:#E9E9E9"|57,135
|width="40" align="right" style="background-color:#E9E9E9"|100.00
|width="40" align="right" style="background-color:#E9E9E9"|
|-
|colspan=2|Registered voters/turnout
||106,357||53.72||1.0
|-
| colspan=11 align=left | Source: Funchal 2021 election results
|-
|style="width: 9px" bgcolor= align="center" | 
|align="left" colspan="6"|Social Democratic / People's gain from PS / BE / PAN / MPT / PDR
|}

Gondomar

|-
| colspan="11" style="text-align:center;" | 
|-
! rowspan="2" colspan=2 style="background-color:#E9E9E9" align=left|Parties
! rowspan="2" style="background-color:#E9E9E9" align=right|Votes
! rowspan="2" style="background-color:#E9E9E9" align=right|%
! rowspan="2" style="background-color:#E9E9E9" align=right|±pp swing
! colspan="2" style="background-color:#E9E9E9" align="center"|Councillors
|- style="background-color:#E9E9E9"
! style="background-color:#E9E9E9" align="center"|Total
! style="background-color:#E9E9E9" align="center"|±
|-
| 
|33,469||46.89||1.4||7||1
|-
|style="width: 9px" bgcolor= align="center" | 
|align=left|Social Democratic / People's
|15,400||21.58||10.5||3||2
|-
| 
|7,735||10.84||4.5||1||1
|-
| 
|4,130||5.79||2.2||0||0
|-
|style="width: 9px" bgcolor=#202056 align="center" | 
|align=left|CHEGA
|2,857||4.00||||0||
|-
| 
|2,066||2.89||||0||
|- 
|style="width: 9px" bgcolor=#00ADEF align="center" | 
|align=left|Liberal Initiative
|1,945||2.73||||0||
|-
|colspan=2 width="330" align=left style="background-color:#E9E9E9"|Total valid
|width="50" align="right" style="background-color:#E9E9E9"|67,602
|width="40" align="right" style="background-color:#E9E9E9"|94.71
|width="40" align="right" style="background-color:#E9E9E9"|0.7
|width="40" align="right" style="background-color:#E9E9E9"|11
|width="40" align="right" style="background-color:#E9E9E9"|0
|-
|colspan=2|Blank ballots
|2,311||3.24||1.0||colspan=3 rowspan=4|
|-
|colspan=2|Invalid ballots
|1,462||2.05||0.3
|-
|colspan=2 align=left style="background-color:#E9E9E9"|Total
|width="50" align="right" style="background-color:#E9E9E9"|71,375
|width="40" align="right" style="background-color:#E9E9E9"|100.00
|width="40" align="right" style="background-color:#E9E9E9"|
|-
|colspan=2|Registered voters/turnout
||146,210||48.82||7.3
|-
| colspan=11 align=left | Source: Gondomar 2021 election results
|-
|style="width: 9px" bgcolor= align="center" | 
|align="left" colspan="6"|Socialist hold
|}

Guarda

|-
| colspan="11" style="text-align:center;" | 
|-
! rowspan="2" colspan=2 style="background-color:#E9E9E9" align=left|Parties
! rowspan="2" style="background-color:#E9E9E9" align=right|Votes
! rowspan="2" style="background-color:#E9E9E9" align=right|%
! rowspan="2" style="background-color:#E9E9E9" align=right|±pp swing
! colspan="2" style="background-color:#E9E9E9" align="center"|Councillors
|- style="background-color:#E9E9E9"
! style="background-color:#E9E9E9" align="center"|Total
! style="background-color:#E9E9E9" align="center"|±
|-
|style="width: 8px" bgcolor=gray align="center" | 
|align=left|For Guarda (PG)
|8,559||36.22||||3||
|-
| 
|7,958||33.68||27.5||3||2
|-
| 
|4,249||17.98||5.4||1||1
|-
| 
|636||2.69||2.9||0||0
|-
|style="width: 9px" bgcolor=#202056 align="center" | 
|align=left|CHEGA
|636||2.69||||0||
|-
| 
|378||1.60||1.4||0||0
|-
| 
|310||1.31||0.8||0||0
|-
|colspan=2 width="330" align=left style="background-color:#E9E9E9"|Total valid
|width="50" align="right" style="background-color:#E9E9E9"|22,726
|width="40" align="right" style="background-color:#E9E9E9"|96.18
|width="40" align="right" style="background-color:#E9E9E9"|0.9
|width="40" align="right" style="background-color:#E9E9E9"|7
|width="40" align="right" style="background-color:#E9E9E9"|0
|-
|colspan=2|Blank ballots
|433||1.83||0.6||colspan=3 rowspan=4|
|-
|colspan=2|Invalid ballots
|469||1.98||0.3
|-
|colspan=2 align=left style="background-color:#E9E9E9"|Total
|width="50" align="right" style="background-color:#E9E9E9"|23,628
|width="40" align="right" style="background-color:#E9E9E9"|100.00
|width="40" align="right" style="background-color:#E9E9E9"|
|-
|colspan=2|Registered voters/turnout
||37,390||63.19||2.3
|-
| colspan=11 align=left | Source: Guarda 2021 election results
|-
|style="width: 9px" bgcolor=gray align="center" | 
|align="left" colspan="6"|Independent gain from Social Democratic
|}

Guimarães

|-
| colspan="11" style="text-align:center;" | 
|-
! rowspan="2" colspan=2 style="background-color:#E9E9E9" align=left|Parties
! rowspan="2" style="background-color:#E9E9E9" align=right|Votes
! rowspan="2" style="background-color:#E9E9E9" align=right|%
! rowspan="2" style="background-color:#E9E9E9" align=right|±pp swing
! colspan="2" style="background-color:#E9E9E9" align="center"|Councillors
|- style="background-color:#E9E9E9"
! style="background-color:#E9E9E9" align="center"|Total
! style="background-color:#E9E9E9" align="center"|±
|-
| 
|43,684||48.06||3.5||7||1
|-
|style="width: 9px" bgcolor= align="center" | 
|align=left|Social Democratic / People's
|31,069||34.18||3.7||4||1
|-
| 
|5,028||5.53||0.2||0||0
|-
|style="width: 9px" bgcolor=#202056 align="center" | 
|align=left|CHEGA
|2,977||3.28||||0||
|-
| 
|2,256||2.48||0.1||0||0
|-
|style="width: 9px" bgcolor=#00ADEF align="center" | 
|align=left|Liberal Initiative
|1,619||1.78||||0||
|-
| 
|1,151||1.27||||0||
|- 
|colspan=2 width="330" align=left style="background-color:#E9E9E9"|Total valid
|width="50" align="right" style="background-color:#E9E9E9"|87,784
|width="40" align="right" style="background-color:#E9E9E9"|96.58
|width="40" align="right" style="background-color:#E9E9E9"|0.5
|width="40" align="right" style="background-color:#E9E9E9"|11
|width="40" align="right" style="background-color:#E9E9E9"|0
|-
|colspan=2|Blank ballots
|2,258||2.48||0.5||colspan=3 rowspan=4|
|-
|colspan=2|Invalid ballots
|847||0.93||0.1
|-
|colspan=2 align=left style="background-color:#E9E9E9"|Total
|width="50" align="right" style="background-color:#E9E9E9"|90,889
|width="40" align="right" style="background-color:#E9E9E9"|100.00
|width="40" align="right" style="background-color:#E9E9E9"|
|-
|colspan=2|Registered voters/turnout
||142,954||63.58||3.2
|-
| colspan=11 align=left | Source: Guimarães 2021 election results
|-
|style="width: 9px" bgcolor= align="center" | 
|align="left" colspan="6"|Socialist hold
|}

Leiria

|-
| colspan="11" style="text-align:center;" | 
|-
! rowspan="2" colspan=2 style="background-color:#E9E9E9" align=left|Parties
! rowspan="2" style="background-color:#E9E9E9" align=right|Votes
! rowspan="2" style="background-color:#E9E9E9" align=right|%
! rowspan="2" style="background-color:#E9E9E9" align=right|±pp swing
! colspan="2" style="background-color:#E9E9E9" align="center"|Councillors
|- style="background-color:#E9E9E9"
! style="background-color:#E9E9E9" align="center"|Total
! style="background-color:#E9E9E9" align="center"|±
|-
| 
|31,658||52.47||2.0||8||0
|-
| 
|13,502||22.38||4.6||3||0
|-
|style="width: 9px" bgcolor=#202056 align="center" | 
|align=left|CHEGA
|3,424||5.67||||0||
|-
|style="width: 9px" bgcolor=#0093DD align="center" | 
|align=left|People's / Earth
|2,555||4.23||0.8||0||0
|-
| 
|1,525||2.53||0.1||0||0
|-
| 
|1,455||2.41||0.3||0||0
|-
|style="width: 9px" bgcolor=#00ADEF align="center" | 
|align=left|Liberal Initiative
|1,440||2.39||||0||
|-
| 
|1,103||1.83||0.4||0||0
|-
| 
|401||0.61||||0||
|- 
|colspan=2 width="330" align=left style="background-color:#E9E9E9"|Total valid
|width="50" align="right" style="background-color:#E9E9E9"|57,063
|width="40" align="right" style="background-color:#E9E9E9"|94.57
|width="40" align="right" style="background-color:#E9E9E9"|0.6
|width="40" align="right" style="background-color:#E9E9E9"|11
|width="40" align="right" style="background-color:#E9E9E9"|0
|-
|colspan=2|Blank ballots
|2,134||3.54||0.1||colspan=3 rowspan=4|
|-
|colspan=2|Invalid ballots
|1,462||1.89||0.4
|-
|colspan=2 align=left style="background-color:#E9E9E9"|Total
|width="50" align="right" style="background-color:#E9E9E9"|60,338
|width="40" align="right" style="background-color:#E9E9E9"|100.00
|width="40" align="right" style="background-color:#E9E9E9"|
|-
|colspan=2|Registered voters/turnout
||113,419||53.20||1.4
|-
| colspan=11 align=left | Source: Leiria 2021 election results
|-
|style="width: 9px" bgcolor= align="center" | 
|align="left" colspan="6"|Socialist hold
|}

Lisbon

|-
| colspan="11" style="text-align:center;" | 
|-
! rowspan="2" colspan=2 style="background-color:#E9E9E9" align=left|Parties
! rowspan="2" style="background-color:#E9E9E9" align=right|Votes
! rowspan="2" style="background-color:#E9E9E9" align=right|%
! rowspan="2" style="background-color:#E9E9E9" align=right|±pp swing
! colspan="2" style="background-color:#E9E9E9" align="center"|Councillors
|- style="background-color:#E9E9E9"
! style="background-color:#E9E9E9" align="center"|Total
! style="background-color:#E9E9E9" align="center"|±
|-
|style="width: 9px" bgcolor= align="center" | 
|align=left|PSD / CDS–PP / Alliance / MPT / PPM
|83,163||34.26||2.5||7||1
|-
|style="width: 9px" bgcolor=#FF66FF align="center" |
|align=left|Socialist / LIVRE
|80,869||33.31||8.7||7||1
|-
| 
|25,520||10.51||1.0||2||0
|-
| 
|15,054||6.20||0.9||1||0
|-
|style="width: 9px" bgcolor=#202056 align="center" | 
|align=left|CHEGA
|10,713||4.41||||0||
|-
|style="width: 9px" bgcolor=#00ADEF align="center" | 
|align=left|Liberal Initiative
|10,238||4.22||||0||
|-
| 
|6,625||2.73||0.3||0||0
|-
|style="width: 9px" bgcolor=Purple align="center" | 
|align=left|Volt Portugal
|1,011||0.42||||0||
|-
|style="width: 8px" bgcolor=gray align="center" | 
|align=left|We are all Lisbon (STL)
|864||0.36||||0||
|-
|style="width: 9px" bgcolor=gold align="center" | 
|align=left|We, the Citizens! 
|530||0.22||0.4||0||0
|-
| 
|339||0.14||0.4||0||0
|-
|style="width: 9px" bgcolor=black align="center" | 
|align=left|Democratic Republican
|319||0.13||0.2||0||0
|-
|colspan=2 width="330" align=left style="background-color:#E9E9E9"|Total valid
|width="50" align="right" style="background-color:#E9E9E9"|235,245
|width="40" align="right" style="background-color:#E9E9E9"|96.91
|width="40" align="right" style="background-color:#E9E9E9"|1.1
|width="40" align="right" style="background-color:#E9E9E9"|17
|width="40" align="right" style="background-color:#E9E9E9"|0
|-
|colspan=2|Blank ballots
|4,818||1.98||0.6||colspan=3 rowspan=4|
|-
|colspan=2|Invalid ballots
|2,688||1.11||0.4
|-
|colspan=2 align=left style="background-color:#E9E9E9"|Total
|width="50" align="right" style="background-color:#E9E9E9"|242,751
|width="40" align="right" style="background-color:#E9E9E9"|100.00
|width="40" align="right" style="background-color:#E9E9E9"|
|-
|colspan=2|Registered voters/turnout
||476,750||50.92||0.2
|-
| colspan=11 align=left | Source: Lisbon 2021 election results
|-
|style="width: 9px" bgcolor= align="center" | 
|align="left" colspan="6"|PSD / CDS–PP / Alliance / MPT / PPM gain from Socialist / LIVRE
|}

Loures

|-
| colspan="11" style="text-align:center;" | 
|-
! rowspan="2" colspan=2 style="background-color:#E9E9E9" align=left|Parties
! rowspan="2" style="background-color:#E9E9E9" align=right|Votes
! rowspan="2" style="background-color:#E9E9E9" align=right|%
! rowspan="2" style="background-color:#E9E9E9" align=right|±pp swing
! colspan="2" style="background-color:#E9E9E9" align="center"|Councillors
|- style="background-color:#E9E9E9"
! style="background-color:#E9E9E9" align="center"|Total
! style="background-color:#E9E9E9" align="center"|±
|-
| 
|25,777||31.52||3.3||4||0
|-
| 
|23,756||29.05||3.7||4||0
|-
| 
|11,451||14.00||7.5||2||1
|-
|style="width: 9px" bgcolor=#202056 align="center" | 
|align=left|CHEGA
|6,884||8.42||||1||
|-
| 
|3,170||3.88||0.3||0||0
|-
|style="width: 9px" bgcolor=#00ADEF align="center" | 
|align=left|Liberal Initiative
|2,729||3.34||||0||
|-
| 
|1,834||2.24||0.1||0||0
|-
|style="width: 9px" bgcolor=#0093DD align="center" | 
|align=left|People's
|1,251||1.53||1.4||0||0
|-
| 
|1,249||1.53||1.0||0||0
|- 
|colspan=2 width="330" align=left style="background-color:#E9E9E9"|Total valid
|width="50" align="right" style="background-color:#E9E9E9"|78,101
|width="40" align="right" style="background-color:#E9E9E9"|95.49
|width="40" align="right" style="background-color:#E9E9E9"|0.2
|width="40" align="right" style="background-color:#E9E9E9"|11
|width="40" align="right" style="background-color:#E9E9E9"|0
|-
|colspan=2|Blank ballots
|2,275||2.78||0.0||colspan=3 rowspan=4|
|-
|colspan=2|Invalid ballots
|1,410||1.72||0.3
|-
|colspan=2 align=left style="background-color:#E9E9E9"|Total
|width="50" align="right" style="background-color:#E9E9E9"|81,786
|width="40" align="right" style="background-color:#E9E9E9"|100.00
|width="40" align="right" style="background-color:#E9E9E9"|
|-
|colspan=2|Registered voters/turnout
||169,257||48.32||4.0
|-
| colspan=11 align=left | Source: Loures 2021 election results
|-
|style="width: 9px" bgcolor= align="center" | 
|align="left" colspan="6"|Socialist gain from Unitary Democratic Coalition
|}

Maia

|-
| colspan="11" style="text-align:center;" | 
|-
! rowspan="2" colspan=2 style="background-color:#E9E9E9" align=left|Parties
! rowspan="2" style="background-color:#E9E9E9" align=right|Votes
! rowspan="2" style="background-color:#E9E9E9" align=right|%
! rowspan="2" style="background-color:#E9E9E9" align=right|±pp swing
! colspan="2" style="background-color:#E9E9E9" align="center"|Councillors
|- style="background-color:#E9E9E9"
! style="background-color:#E9E9E9" align="center"|Total
! style="background-color:#E9E9E9" align="center"|±
|-
|style="width: 9px" bgcolor= align="center" | 
|align=left|Social Democratic / People's
|24,732||40.42||0.5||6||0
|-
| 
|19,740||32.26||4.3||5||0
|-
| 
|3,159||5.16||0.6||0||0
|-
| 
|2,946||4.81||0.2||0||0
|-
|style="width: 9px" bgcolor=#202056 align="center" | 
|align=left|CHEGA
|2,355||3.85||||0||
|-
| 
|2,291||3.74||0.7||0||0
|- 
|style="width: 9px" bgcolor=#00ADEF align="center" | 
|align=left|Liberal Initiative
|2,240||3.66||||0||
|-
| 
|128||0.21||||0||
|-
|colspan=2 width="330" align=left style="background-color:#E9E9E9"|Total valid
|width="50" align="right" style="background-color:#E9E9E9"|57,591
|width="40" align="right" style="background-color:#E9E9E9"|94.11
|width="40" align="right" style="background-color:#E9E9E9"|0.9
|width="40" align="right" style="background-color:#E9E9E9"|11
|width="40" align="right" style="background-color:#E9E9E9"|0
|-
|colspan=2|Blank ballots
|2,425||3.96||0.4||colspan=3 rowspan=4|
|-
|colspan=2|Invalid ballots
|1,178||1.93||0.5
|-
|colspan=2 align=left style="background-color:#E9E9E9"|Total
|width="50" align="right" style="background-color:#E9E9E9"|61,194
|width="40" align="right" style="background-color:#E9E9E9"|100.00
|width="40" align="right" style="background-color:#E9E9E9"|
|-
|colspan=2|Registered voters/turnout
||116,981||52.31||7.3
|-
| colspan=11 align=left | Source: Maia 2021 election results
|-
|style="width: 9px" bgcolor= align="center" | 
|align="left" colspan="6"|Social Democratic / People's hold
|}

Matosinhos

|-
| colspan="11" style="text-align:center;" | 
|-
! rowspan="2" colspan=2 style="background-color:#E9E9E9" align=left|Parties
! rowspan="2" style="background-color:#E9E9E9" align=right|Votes
! rowspan="2" style="background-color:#E9E9E9" align=right|%
! rowspan="2" style="background-color:#E9E9E9" align=right|±pp swing
! colspan="2" style="background-color:#E9E9E9" align="center"|Councillors
|- style="background-color:#E9E9E9"
! style="background-color:#E9E9E9" align="center"|Total
! style="background-color:#E9E9E9" align="center"|±
|-
| 
|30,373||43.67||7.3||7||2
|-
|style="width: 9px" bgcolor= align="center" | 
|align=left|Social Democratic / People's
|12,015||17.25||5.4||2||1
|-
|style="width: 9px" bgcolor=gray align="center" | 
|align=left|ANTÓNIO PARADA SIM!
|6,873||9.87||5.3||1||1
|-
| 
|4,580||6.58||0.1||1||0
|-
| 
|3,938||5.66||1.1||0||0
|-
|style="width: 9px" bgcolor=#00ADEF align="center" | 
|align=left|Liberal Initiative
|3,271||4.70||||0||
|-
|style="width: 9px" bgcolor=#202056 align="center" | 
|align=left|CHEGA
|2,646||3.80||||0||
|-
| 
|1,885||2.71||0.5||0||0
|-
|style="width: 9px" bgcolor=gray align="center" | 
|align=left|Independent Matosinhos (MI)
|650||0.93||||0||
|- 
|colspan=2 width="330" align=left style="background-color:#E9E9E9"|Total valid
|width="50" align="right" style="background-color:#E9E9E9"|66,231
|width="40" align="right" style="background-color:#E9E9E9"|95.11
|width="40" align="right" style="background-color:#E9E9E9"|1.1
|width="40" align="right" style="background-color:#E9E9E9"|11
|width="40" align="right" style="background-color:#E9E9E9"|0
|-
|colspan=2|Blank ballots
|2,250||3.23||0.4||colspan=3 rowspan=4|
|-
|colspan=2|Invalid ballots
|1,155||1.66||0.7
|-
|colspan=2 align=left style="background-color:#E9E9E9"|Total
|width="50" align="right" style="background-color:#E9E9E9"|69,636
|width="40" align="right" style="background-color:#E9E9E9"|100.00
|width="40" align="right" style="background-color:#E9E9E9"|
|-
|colspan=2|Registered voters/turnout
||151,342||46.01||6.9
|-
| colspan=11 align=left | Source: Matosinhos 2021 election results
|-
|style="width: 9px" bgcolor= align="center" | 
|align="left" colspan="6"|Socialist hold
|}

Odivelas

|-
| colspan="11" style="text-align:center;" | 
|-
! rowspan="2" colspan=2 style="background-color:#E9E9E9" align=left|Parties
! rowspan="2" style="background-color:#E9E9E9" align=right|Votes
! rowspan="2" style="background-color:#E9E9E9" align=right|%
! rowspan="2" style="background-color:#E9E9E9" align=right|±pp swing
! colspan="2" style="background-color:#E9E9E9" align="center"|Councillors
|- style="background-color:#E9E9E9"
! style="background-color:#E9E9E9" align="center"|Total
! style="background-color:#E9E9E9" align="center"|±
|-
| 
|24,693||44.84||0.3||6||0
|-
|style="width: 9px" bgcolor= align="center" |
|align=left|PSD / CDS–PP / Alliance / MPT / PDR / PPM / RIR
|11,083||20.13||1.6||3||0
|-
| 
|5,965||10.83||4.0||1||1
|-
|style="width: 9px" bgcolor=#202056 align="center" | 
|align=left|CHEGA
|4,795||8.71||||1||
|-
| 
|2,605||4.73||1.4||0||0
|-
| 
|1,758||3.19||0.2||0||0
|-
|style="width: 9px" bgcolor=#00ADEF align="center" | 
|align=left|Liberal Initiative
|1,684||3.06||||0||
|-
|colspan=2 width="330" align=left style="background-color:#E9E9E9"|Total valid
|width="50" align="right" style="background-color:#E9E9E9"|52,583
|width="40" align="right" style="background-color:#E9E9E9"|95.49
|width="40" align="right" style="background-color:#E9E9E9"|1.3
|width="40" align="right" style="background-color:#E9E9E9"|11
|width="40" align="right" style="background-color:#E9E9E9"|0
|-
|colspan=2|Blank ballots
|1,449||2.63||0.7||colspan=3 rowspan=4|
|-
|colspan=2|Invalid ballots
|1,037||1.88||0.6
|-
|colspan=2 align=left style="background-color:#E9E9E9"|Total
|width="50" align="right" style="background-color:#E9E9E9"|55,069
|width="40" align="right" style="background-color:#E9E9E9"|100.00
|width="40" align="right" style="background-color:#E9E9E9"|
|-
|colspan=2|Registered voters/turnout
||126,833||43.42||3.3
|-
| colspan=11 align=left | Source: Odivelas 2021 election results
|-
|style="width: 9px" bgcolor= align="center" | 
|align="left" colspan="6"|Socialist hold
|}

Oeiras

|-
| colspan="11" style="text-align:center;" | 
|-
! rowspan="2" colspan=2 style="background-color:#E9E9E9" align=left|Parties
! rowspan="2" style="background-color:#E9E9E9" align=right|Votes
! rowspan="2" style="background-color:#E9E9E9" align=right|%
! rowspan="2" style="background-color:#E9E9E9" align=right|±pp swing
! colspan="2" style="background-color:#E9E9E9" align="center"|Councillors
|- style="background-color:#E9E9E9"
! style="background-color:#E9E9E9" align="center"|Total
! style="background-color:#E9E9E9" align="center"|±
|-
|style="width: 9px" bgcolor=gray align="center" | 
|align=left|Isaltino Inovate Oeiras (IN-OV)
|38,776||50.86||9.2||8||2
|-
| 
|8,021||10.52||2.9||1||0
|-
|style="width: 9px" bgcolor= align="center" | 
|align=left|Social Democratic / Earth
|6,032||7.91||||1||
|-
|style="width: 9px" bgcolor=#8B0000 align="center" | 
|align=left|Left Bloc / LIVRE / Volt
|5,539||7.25||3.5||1||1
|-
| 
|3,994||5.24||2.6||0||1
|-
|style="width: 9px" bgcolor=#00ADEF align="center" | 
|align=left|Liberal Initiative
|3,084||4.05||||0||
|-
|style="width: 9px" bgcolor=#202056 align="center" | 
|align=left|CHEGA
|2,827||3.71||||0||
|-
| 
|2,249||2.95||0.5||0||0
|-
| 
|1,319||1.73||||0||
|- 
|style="width: 9px" bgcolor=#6AD1E3 align="center" | 
|align=left|Alliance / Democratic Republican
|423||0.55||||0||
|- 
|colspan=2 width="330" align=left style="background-color:#E9E9E9"|Total valid
|width="50" align="right" style="background-color:#E9E9E9"|72,264
|width="40" align="right" style="background-color:#E9E9E9"|94.78
|width="40" align="right" style="background-color:#E9E9E9"|0.0
|width="40" align="right" style="background-color:#E9E9E9"|11
|width="40" align="right" style="background-color:#E9E9E9"|0
|-
|colspan=2|Blank ballots
|2,561||3.36||0.0||colspan=3 rowspan=4|
|-
|colspan=2|Invalid ballots
|1,417||1.86||0.0
|-
|colspan=2 align=left style="background-color:#E9E9E9"|Total
|width="50" align="right" style="background-color:#E9E9E9"|76,242
|width="40" align="right" style="background-color:#E9E9E9"|100.00
|width="40" align="right" style="background-color:#E9E9E9"|
|-
|colspan=2|Registered voters/turnout
||147,343||51.74||4.0
|-
| colspan=11 align=left | Source: Oeiras 2021 election results
|-
|style="width: 9px" bgcolor=gray align="center" | 
|align="left" colspan="6"|Independent hold
|}

Ponta Delgada

|-
| colspan="11" style="text-align:center;" | 
|-
! rowspan="2" colspan=2 style="background-color:#E9E9E9" align=left|Parties
! rowspan="2" style="background-color:#E9E9E9" align=right|Votes
! rowspan="2" style="background-color:#E9E9E9" align=right|%
! rowspan="2" style="background-color:#E9E9E9" align=right|±pp swing
! colspan="2" style="background-color:#E9E9E9" align="center"|Councillors
|- style="background-color:#E9E9E9"
! style="background-color:#E9E9E9" align="center"|Total
! style="background-color:#E9E9E9" align="center"|±
|-
| 
|14,059||48.76||2.5||5||0
|-
| 
|10,763||37.33||1.8||4||0
|-
| 
|789||2.74||0.6||0||0
|-
|style="width: 9px" bgcolor=#00ADEF align="center" | 
|align=left|Liberal Initiative
|782||2.71||||0||
|-
| 
|586||2.03||0.2||0||0
|-
|style="width: 9px" bgcolor=#202056 align="center" | 
|align=left|CHEGA
|544||1.92||||0||
|-
| 
|334||1.19||0.1||0||0
|-
|colspan=2 width="330" align=left style="background-color:#E9E9E9"|Total valid
|width="50" align="right" style="background-color:#E9E9E9"|27,877
|width="40" align="right" style="background-color:#E9E9E9"|96.68
|width="40" align="right" style="background-color:#E9E9E9"|0.5
|width="40" align="right" style="background-color:#E9E9E9"|9
|width="40" align="right" style="background-color:#E9E9E9"|0
|-
|colspan=2|Blank ballots
|659||2.29||0.7||colspan=3 rowspan=4|
|-
|colspan=2|Invalid ballots
|298||1.03||0.2
|-
|colspan=2 align=left style="background-color:#E9E9E9"|Total
|width="50" align="right" style="background-color:#E9E9E9"|28,834
|width="40" align="right" style="background-color:#E9E9E9"|100.00
|width="40" align="right" style="background-color:#E9E9E9"|
|-
|colspan=2|Registered voters/turnout
||65,200||44.22||1.5
|-
| colspan=11 align=left | Source: Ponta Delgada 2021 election results
|-
|style="width: 9px" bgcolor= align="center" | 
|align="left" colspan="6"|Social Democratic hold
|}

Portalegre

|-
| colspan="11" style="text-align:center;" | 
|-
! rowspan="2" colspan=2 style="background-color:#E9E9E9" align=left|Parties
! rowspan="2" style="background-color:#E9E9E9" align=right|Votes
! rowspan="2" style="background-color:#E9E9E9" align=right|%
! rowspan="2" style="background-color:#E9E9E9" align=right|±pp swing
! colspan="2" style="background-color:#E9E9E9" align="center"|Councillors
|- style="background-color:#E9E9E9"
! style="background-color:#E9E9E9" align="center"|Total
! style="background-color:#E9E9E9" align="center"|±
|-
|style="width: 9px" bgcolor= align="center" | 
|align=left|Social Democratic / People's
|4,993||38.39||21.0||3||2
|-
| 
|3,297||25.35||3.5||2||0
|-
|style="width: 9px" bgcolor=gray align="center" | 
|align=left|Free Independent Candidacy for Portalegre (CLIP)
|3,267||25.12||6.5||2||1
|-
| 
|853||6.56||11.7||0||1
|-
|style="width: 9px" bgcolor=#202056 align="center" | 
|align=left|CHEGA
|253||1.95||||0||
|-
| 
|53||0.41||0.5||0||0
|-
|colspan=2 width="330" align=left style="background-color:#E9E9E9"|Total valid
|width="50" align="right" style="background-color:#E9E9E9"|12,716
|width="40" align="right" style="background-color:#E9E9E9"|97.78
|width="40" align="right" style="background-color:#E9E9E9"|0.8
|width="40" align="right" style="background-color:#E9E9E9"|7
|width="40" align="right" style="background-color:#E9E9E9"|0
|-
|colspan=2|Blank ballots
|159||1.22||0.6||colspan=3 rowspan=4|
|-
|colspan=2|Invalid ballots
|130||1.00||0.2
|-
|colspan=2 align=left style="background-color:#E9E9E9"|Total
|width="50" align="right" style="background-color:#E9E9E9"|13,005
|width="40" align="right" style="background-color:#E9E9E9"|100.00
|width="40" align="right" style="background-color:#E9E9E9"|
|-
|colspan=2|Registered voters/turnout
||20,033||64.92||1.7
|-
| colspan=11 align=left | Source: Portalegre 2021 election results
|-
|style="width: 9px" bgcolor= align="center" | 
|align="left" colspan="6"|Social Democratic / People's gain from Independent
|}

Porto

|-
| colspan="11" style="text-align:center;" | 
|-
! rowspan="2" colspan=2 style="background-color:#E9E9E9" align=left|Parties
! rowspan="2" style="background-color:#E9E9E9" align=right|Votes
! rowspan="2" style="background-color:#E9E9E9" align=right|%
! rowspan="2" style="background-color:#E9E9E9" align=right|±pp swing
! colspan="2" style="background-color:#E9E9E9" align="center"|Councillors
|- style="background-color:#E9E9E9"
! style="background-color:#E9E9E9" align="center"|Total
! style="background-color:#E9E9E9" align="center"|±
|-
|style="width: 9px" bgcolor=gray align="center" | 
|align=left|Here there's Porto. Rui Moreira (RM)
|41,167||40.72||3.8||6||1
|-
| 
|18,201||18.00||10.5||3||1
|-
|style="width: 9px" bgcolor= align="center" | 
|align=left|Social Democratic
|17,426||17.24||6.9||2||1
|-
| 
|7,609||7.53||1.6||1||0
|-
| 
|6,323||6.25||0.9||1||1
|-
|style="width: 9px" bgcolor=#202056 align="center" | 
|align=left|CHEGA
|2,980||2.95||||0||
|-
| 
|2,819||2.79||0.9||0||0
|-
| 
|462||0.46||||0||
|- 
|style="width: 9px" bgcolor=Purple align="center" | 
|align=left|Volt Portugal
|423||0.42||||0||
|- 
| 
|212||0.21||||0||
|- 
| 
|80||0.08||||0||
|- 
|colspan=2 width="330" align=left style="background-color:#E9E9E9"|Total valid
|width="50" align="right" style="background-color:#E9E9E9"|97,702
|width="40" align="right" style="background-color:#E9E9E9"|96.64
|width="40" align="right" style="background-color:#E9E9E9"|0.4
|width="40" align="right" style="background-color:#E9E9E9"|13
|width="40" align="right" style="background-color:#E9E9E9"|0
|-
|colspan=2|Blank ballots
|2,251||2.23||0.6||colspan=3 rowspan=4|
|-
|colspan=2|Invalid ballots
|1,148||1.14||0.3
|-
|colspan=2 align=left style="background-color:#E9E9E9"|Total
|width="50" align="right" style="background-color:#E9E9E9"|101,101
|width="40" align="right" style="background-color:#E9E9E9"|100.00
|width="40" align="right" style="background-color:#E9E9E9"|
|-
|colspan=2|Registered voters/turnout
||207,129||48.81||4.9
|-
| colspan=11 align=left | Source: Porto 2021 election results
|-
|style="width: 9px" bgcolor=gray align="center" | 
|align="left" colspan="6"|Independent hold
|}

Santarém

|-
| colspan="11" style="text-align:center;" | 
|-
! rowspan="2" colspan=2 style="background-color:#E9E9E9" align=left|Parties
! rowspan="2" style="background-color:#E9E9E9" align=right|Votes
! rowspan="2" style="background-color:#E9E9E9" align=right|%
! rowspan="2" style="background-color:#E9E9E9" align=right|±pp swing
! colspan="2" style="background-color:#E9E9E9" align="center"|Councillors
|- style="background-color:#E9E9E9"
! style="background-color:#E9E9E9" align="center"|Total
! style="background-color:#E9E9E9" align="center"|±
|-
| 
|10,069||37.42||5.8||4||1
|-
| 
|8,950||33.26||0.8||4||0
|-
|style="width: 9px" bgcolor=#202056 align="center" | 
|align=left|CHEGA
|2,133||7.93||||1||
|-
| 
|1,927||7.16||0.5||0||0
|-
| 
|1,132||4.21||0.1||0||0
|-
|style="width: 9px" bgcolor=#0093DD align="center" | 
|align=left|People's
|706||2.62||2.8||0||0
|-
|style="width: 9px" bgcolor=#00ADEF align="center" | 
|align=left|Liberal Initiative
|574||2.13||||0||
|-
| 
|306||1.14||||0||
|-
|colspan=2 width="330" align=left style="background-color:#E9E9E9"|Total valid
|width="50" align="right" style="background-color:#E9E9E9"|25,797
|width="40" align="right" style="background-color:#E9E9E9"|95.87
|width="40" align="right" style="background-color:#E9E9E9"|1.0
|width="40" align="right" style="background-color:#E9E9E9"|9
|width="40" align="right" style="background-color:#E9E9E9"|0
|-
|colspan=2|Blank ballots
|746||2.77||0.5||colspan=3 rowspan=4|
|-
|colspan=2|Invalid ballots
|366||1.36||0.4
|-
|colspan=2 align=left style="background-color:#E9E9E9"|Total
|width="50" align="right" style="background-color:#E9E9E9"|26,909
|width="40" align="right" style="background-color:#E9E9E9"|100.00
|width="40" align="right" style="background-color:#E9E9E9"|
|-
|colspan=2|Registered voters/turnout
||50,899||52.87||0.8
|-
| colspan=11 align=left | Source: Santarém 2021 election results
|-
|style="width: 9px" bgcolor= align="center" | 
|align="left" colspan="6"|Social Democratic hold
|}

Santa Maria da Feira

|-
| colspan="11" style="text-align:center;" | 
|-
! rowspan="2" colspan=2 style="background-color:#E9E9E9" align=left|Parties
! rowspan="2" style="background-color:#E9E9E9" align=right|Votes
! rowspan="2" style="background-color:#E9E9E9" align=right|%
! rowspan="2" style="background-color:#E9E9E9" align=right|±pp swing
! colspan="2" style="background-color:#E9E9E9" align="center"|Councillors
|- style="background-color:#E9E9E9"
! style="background-color:#E9E9E9" align="center"|Total
! style="background-color:#E9E9E9" align="center"|±
|-
| 
|34,177||48.91||1.6||7||0
|-
| 
|21,026||30.09||2.4||4||0
|-
| 
|2,596||3.72||0.4||0||0
|-
|style="width: 9px" bgcolor=#0093DD align="center" | 
|align=left|People's
|2,275||3.26||1.0||0||0
|-
|style="width: 9px" bgcolor=#202056 align="center" | 
|align=left|CHEGA
|1,979||2.83||||0||
|-
|style="width: 9px" bgcolor=#00ADEF align="center" | 
|align=left|Liberal Initiative
|1,886||2.70||||0||
|-
| 
|1,627||2.33||0.4||0||0
|-
| 
|1,029||1.47||||0||
|-
|colspan=2 width="330" align=left style="background-color:#E9E9E9"|Total valid
|width="50" align="right" style="background-color:#E9E9E9"|66,595
|width="40" align="right" style="background-color:#E9E9E9"|95.31
|width="40" align="right" style="background-color:#E9E9E9"|0.7
|width="40" align="right" style="background-color:#E9E9E9"|11
|width="40" align="right" style="background-color:#E9E9E9"|0
|-
|colspan=2|Blank ballots
|2,113||3.02||0.1||colspan=3 rowspan=4|
|-
|colspan=2|Invalid ballots
|1,167||1.67||0.6
|-
|colspan=2 align=left style="background-color:#E9E9E9"|Total
|width="50" align="right" style="background-color:#E9E9E9"|69,875
|width="40" align="right" style="background-color:#E9E9E9"|100.00
|width="40" align="right" style="background-color:#E9E9E9"|
|-
|colspan=2|Registered voters/turnout
||125,645||55.61||1.7
|-
| colspan=11 align=left | Source: Santa Maria da Feira 2021 election results
|-
|style="width: 9px" bgcolor= align="center" | 
|align="left" colspan="6"|Social Democratic hold
|}

Seixal

|-
| colspan="11" style="text-align:center;" | 
|-
! rowspan="2" colspan=2 style="background-color:#E9E9E9" align=left|Parties
! rowspan="2" style="background-color:#E9E9E9" align=right|Votes
! rowspan="2" style="background-color:#E9E9E9" align=right|%
! rowspan="2" style="background-color:#E9E9E9" align=right|±pp swing
! colspan="2" style="background-color:#E9E9E9" align="center"|Councillors
|- style="background-color:#E9E9E9"
! style="background-color:#E9E9E9" align="center"|Total
! style="background-color:#E9E9E9" align="center"|±
|-
| 
|23,485||37.74||1.2||5||0
|-
| 
|19,204||30.86||0.5||4||0
|-
| 
|5,795||9.31||2.5||1||0
|-
|style="width: 9px" bgcolor=#202056 align="center" | 
|align=left|CHEGA
|5,022||8.07||||1||
|-
| 
|2,700||4.34||3.1||0||1
|-
| 
|1,713||2.75||1.4||0||0
|-
|style="width: 9px" bgcolor=#00ADEF align="center" | 
|align=left|Liberal Initiative
|1,144||1.84||||0||
|-
|style="width: 9px" bgcolor=#0093DD align="center" | 
|align=left|CDS–PP / PDR / Alliance / MPT
|908||1.46||1.3||0||0
|-
|colspan=2 width="330" align=left style="background-color:#E9E9E9"|Total valid
|width="50" align="right" style="background-color:#E9E9E9"|59,971
|width="40" align="right" style="background-color:#E9E9E9"|96.37
|width="40" align="right" style="background-color:#E9E9E9"|1.9
|width="40" align="right" style="background-color:#E9E9E9"|11
|width="40" align="right" style="background-color:#E9E9E9"|0
|-
|colspan=2|Blank ballots
|1,395||2.24||1.0||colspan=3 rowspan=4|
|-
|colspan=2|Invalid ballots
|862||1.39||0.9
|-
|colspan=2 align=left style="background-color:#E9E9E9"|Total
|width="50" align="right" style="background-color:#E9E9E9"|62,228
|width="40" align="right" style="background-color:#E9E9E9"|100.00
|width="40" align="right" style="background-color:#E9E9E9"|
|-
|colspan=2|Registered voters/turnout
||142,900||43.55||0.3
|-
| colspan=11 align=left | Source: Seixal 2021 election results
|-
|style="width: 9px" bgcolor= align="center" | 
|align="left" colspan="6"|Unitary Democratic Coalition hold
|}

Setúbal

|-
| colspan="11" style="text-align:center;" | 
|-
! rowspan="2" colspan=2 style="background-color:#E9E9E9" align=left|Parties
! rowspan="2" style="background-color:#E9E9E9" align=right|Votes
! rowspan="2" style="background-color:#E9E9E9" align=right|%
! rowspan="2" style="background-color:#E9E9E9" align=right|±pp swing
! colspan="2" style="background-color:#E9E9E9" align="center"|Councillors
|- style="background-color:#E9E9E9"
! style="background-color:#E9E9E9" align="center"|Total
! style="background-color:#E9E9E9" align="center"|±
|-
| 
|15,316||34.40||15.5||5||2
|-
| 
|12,316||27.67||5.9||4||1
|-
| 
|7,377||16.57||5.6||2||1
|-
|style="width: 9px" bgcolor=#202056 align="center" | 
|align=left|CHEGA
|2,619||5.88||||0||
|-
| 
|1,884||4.23||1.0||0||0
|-
|style="width: 9px" bgcolor=#00ADEF align="center" | 
|align=left|Liberal Initiative
|1,035||2.35||||0||
|-
| 
|1,009||2.27||0.6||0||0
|-
|style="width: 9px" bgcolor=#0093DD align="center" | 
|align=left|People's
|765||1.72||1.5||0||0
|-
|style="width: 9px" bgcolor=gold align="center" | 
|align=left|We, the Citizens! / People's Monarchist
|328||0.74||||0||
|-
|style="width: 9px" bgcolor=LightSeaGreen align="center" | 
|align=left|React, Include, Recycle / Democratic Republican
|237||0.53||||0||
|-
|colspan=2 width="330" align=left style="background-color:#E9E9E9"|Total valid
|width="50" align="right" style="background-color:#E9E9E9"|42,886
|width="40" align="right" style="background-color:#E9E9E9"|96.33
|width="40" align="right" style="background-color:#E9E9E9"|0.3
|width="40" align="right" style="background-color:#E9E9E9"|11
|width="40" align="right" style="background-color:#E9E9E9"|0
|-
|colspan=2|Blank ballots
|1,052||2.36||0.1||colspan=3 rowspan=4|
|-
|colspan=2|Invalid ballots
|580||1.30||0.2
|-
|colspan=2 align=left style="background-color:#E9E9E9"|Total
|width="50" align="right" style="background-color:#E9E9E9"|44,518
|width="40" align="right" style="background-color:#E9E9E9"|100.00
|width="40" align="right" style="background-color:#E9E9E9"|
|-
|colspan=2|Registered voters/turnout
||105,651||42.14||1.0
|-
| colspan=11 align=left | Source: Setúbal 2021 election results
|-
|style="width: 9px" bgcolor= align="center" | 
|align="left" colspan="6"|Unitary Democratic Coalition hold
|}

Sintra

|-
| colspan="11" style="text-align:center;" | 
|-
! rowspan="2" colspan=2 style="background-color:#E9E9E9" align=left|Parties
! rowspan="2" style="background-color:#E9E9E9" align=right|Votes
! rowspan="2" style="background-color:#E9E9E9" align=right|%
! rowspan="2" style="background-color:#E9E9E9" align=right|±pp swing
! colspan="2" style="background-color:#E9E9E9" align="center"|Councillors
|- style="background-color:#E9E9E9"
! style="background-color:#E9E9E9" align="center"|Total
! style="background-color:#E9E9E9" align="center"|±
|-
| 
|45,724||35.25||7.8||5||1
|-
|style="width: 9px" bgcolor= align="center" |
|align=left|PSD / CDS–PP / Alliance / MPT / PDR / PPM / RIR
|35,702||27.53||1.5||4||0
|-
|style="width: 9px" bgcolor=#202056 align="center" | 
|align=left|CHEGA
|11,786||9.09||||1||
|-
| 
|11,701||9.02||0.4||1||0
|-
| 
|7,539||5.81||0.5||0||0
|-
| 
|4,214||3.25||0.4||0||0
|-
|style="width: 9px" bgcolor=gold align="center" | 
|align=left|We, the Citizens!
|3,848||2.97||1.9||0||0
|-
|style="width: 9px" bgcolor=#00ADEF align="center" | 
|align=left|Liberal Initiative
|3,475||2.68||||0||
|-
|colspan=2 width="330" align=left style="background-color:#E9E9E9"|Total valid
|width="50" align="right" style="background-color:#E9E9E9"|123,989
|width="40" align="right" style="background-color:#E9E9E9"|95.59
|width="40" align="right" style="background-color:#E9E9E9"|0.7
|width="40" align="right" style="background-color:#E9E9E9"|11
|width="40" align="right" style="background-color:#E9E9E9"|0
|-
|colspan=2|Blank ballots
|3,489||2.69||0.2||colspan=3 rowspan=4|
|-
|colspan=2|Invalid ballots
|2,228||1.72||0.5
|-
|colspan=2 align=left style="background-color:#E9E9E9"|Total
|width="50" align="right" style="background-color:#E9E9E9"|129,706
|width="40" align="right" style="background-color:#E9E9E9"|100.00
|width="40" align="right" style="background-color:#E9E9E9"|
|-
|colspan=2|Registered voters/turnout
||323,280||40.12||2.2
|-
| colspan=11 align=left | Source: Sintra 2021 election results
|-
|style="width: 9px" bgcolor= align="center" | 
|align="left" colspan="6"|Socialist hold
|}

Viana do Castelo

|-
| colspan="11" style="text-align:center;" | 
|-
! rowspan="2" colspan=2 style="background-color:#E9E9E9" align=left|Parties
! rowspan="2" style="background-color:#E9E9E9" align=right|Votes
! rowspan="2" style="background-color:#E9E9E9" align=right|%
! rowspan="2" style="background-color:#E9E9E9" align=right|±pp swing
! colspan="2" style="background-color:#E9E9E9" align="center"|Councillors
|- style="background-color:#E9E9E9"
! style="background-color:#E9E9E9" align="center"|Total
! style="background-color:#E9E9E9" align="center"|±
|-
| 
|20,970||45.05||8.6||5||1
|-
|style="width: 9px" bgcolor= align="center" |
|align=left|Social Democratic / People's
|11,447||24.59||2.3||3||1
|-
| 
|4,673||10.04||1.9||1||0
|-
| 
|2,114||4.54||0.8||0||0
|-
|style="width: 9px" bgcolor=#6AD1E3 align="center" | 
|align=left|Alliance
|1,788||3.84||||0||
|-
|style="width: 9px" bgcolor=#202056 align="center" | 
|align=left|CHEGA
|1,605||3.45||||0||
|-
|style="width: 9px" bgcolor=#00ADEF align="center" | 
|align=left|Liberal Initiative
|836||1.80||||0||
|-
|style="width: 9px" bgcolor=gold align="center" | 
|align=left|We, the Citizens!
|472||1.01||||0||
|-
|colspan=2 width="330" align=left style="background-color:#E9E9E9"|Total valid
|width="50" align="right" style="background-color:#E9E9E9"|43,905
|width="40" align="right" style="background-color:#E9E9E9"|94.32
|width="40" align="right" style="background-color:#E9E9E9"|0.1
|width="40" align="right" style="background-color:#E9E9E9"|9
|width="40" align="right" style="background-color:#E9E9E9"|0
|-
|colspan=2|Blank ballots
|1,728||3.71||0.1||colspan=3 rowspan=4|
|-
|colspan=2|Invalid ballots
|914||1.96||0.2
|-
|colspan=2 align=left style="background-color:#E9E9E9"|Total
|width="50" align="right" style="background-color:#E9E9E9"|46,547
|width="40" align="right" style="background-color:#E9E9E9"|100.00
|width="40" align="right" style="background-color:#E9E9E9"|
|-
|colspan=2|Registered voters/turnout
||82,728||56.27||1.1
|-
| colspan=11 align=left | Source: Viana do Castelo 2021 election results
|-
|style="width: 9px" bgcolor= align="center" | 
|align="left" colspan="6"|Socialist hold
|}

Vila Franca de Xira

|-
| colspan="11" style="text-align:center;" | 
|-
! rowspan="2" colspan=2 style="background-color:#E9E9E9" align=left|Parties
! rowspan="2" style="background-color:#E9E9E9" align=right|Votes
! rowspan="2" style="background-color:#E9E9E9" align=right|%
! rowspan="2" style="background-color:#E9E9E9" align=right|±pp swing
! colspan="2" style="background-color:#E9E9E9" align="center"|Councillors
|- style="background-color:#E9E9E9"
! style="background-color:#E9E9E9" align="center"|Total
! style="background-color:#E9E9E9" align="center"|±
|-
| 
|20,640||39.59||0.5||5||0
|-
| 
|11,432||21.93||8.5||3||1
|-
|style="width: 9px" bgcolor= align="center" |
|align=left|PSD / CDS–PP / MPT / PPM
|7,737||14.84||1.2||2||1
|-
|style="width: 9px" bgcolor=#202056 align="center" | 
|align=left|CHEGA
|4,447||8.53||||1||
|-
| 
|3,130||6.00||1.0||0||1
|-
| 
|2,018||3.87||0.0||0||0
|-
|colspan=2 width="330" align=left style="background-color:#E9E9E9"|Total valid
|width="50" align="right" style="background-color:#E9E9E9"|49,404
|width="40" align="right" style="background-color:#E9E9E9"|94.77
|width="40" align="right" style="background-color:#E9E9E9"|0.3
|width="40" align="right" style="background-color:#E9E9E9"|11
|width="40" align="right" style="background-color:#E9E9E9"|0
|-
|colspan=2|Blank ballots
|1,849||3.55||0.2||colspan=3 rowspan=4|
|-
|colspan=2|Invalid ballots
|877||1.68||0.5
|-
|colspan=2 align=left style="background-color:#E9E9E9"|Total
|width="50" align="right" style="background-color:#E9E9E9"|52,130
|width="40" align="right" style="background-color:#E9E9E9"|100.00
|width="40" align="right" style="background-color:#E9E9E9"|
|-
|colspan=2|Registered voters/turnout
||113,975||45.74||2.7
|-
| colspan=11 align=left | Source: Vila Franca de Xira 2021 election results
|-
|style="width: 9px" bgcolor= align="center" | 
|align="left" colspan="6"|Socialist hold
|}

Vila Nova de Famalicão

|-
| colspan="11" style="text-align:center;" | 
|-
! rowspan="2" colspan=2 style="background-color:#E9E9E9" align=left|Parties
! rowspan="2" style="background-color:#E9E9E9" align=right|Votes
! rowspan="2" style="background-color:#E9E9E9" align=right|%
! rowspan="2" style="background-color:#E9E9E9" align=right|±pp swing
! colspan="2" style="background-color:#E9E9E9" align="center"|Councillors
|- style="background-color:#E9E9E9"
! style="background-color:#E9E9E9" align="center"|Total
! style="background-color:#E9E9E9" align="center"|±
|-
|style="width: 9px" bgcolor= align="center" |
|align=left|Social Democratic / People's
|40,143||52.88||14.8||7||1
|-
| 
|24,409||32.16||8.6||4||1
|-
|style="width: 9px" bgcolor=#202056 align="center" | 
|align=left|CHEGA
|2,143||2.82||||0||
|-
| 
|1,835||2.42||0.5||0||0
|-
|style="width: 9px" bgcolor=#00ADEF align="center" | 
|align=left|Liberal Initiative
|1,762||2.32||||0||
|-
| 
|1,423||1.87||0.6||0||0
|-
| 
|1,214||1.60||||0||
|-
|colspan=2 width="330" align=left style="background-color:#E9E9E9"|Total valid
|width="50" align="right" style="background-color:#E9E9E9"|72,929
|width="40" align="right" style="background-color:#E9E9E9"|96.07
|width="40" align="right" style="background-color:#E9E9E9"|0.5
|width="40" align="right" style="background-color:#E9E9E9"|11
|width="40" align="right" style="background-color:#E9E9E9"|0
|-
|colspan=2|Blank ballots
|2,074||2.73||0.5||colspan=3 rowspan=4|
|-
|colspan=2|Invalid ballots
|906||1.19||0.0
|-
|colspan=2 align=left style="background-color:#E9E9E9"|Total
|width="50" align="right" style="background-color:#E9E9E9"|75,909
|width="40" align="right" style="background-color:#E9E9E9"|100.00
|width="40" align="right" style="background-color:#E9E9E9"|
|-
|colspan=2|Registered voters/turnout
||119,499||63.52||0.4
|-
| colspan=11 align=left | Source: Vila Nova de Famalicão 2021 election results
|-
|style="width: 9px" bgcolor= align="center" | 
|align="left" colspan="6"|Social Democratic / People's hold
|}

Vila Nova de Gaia

|-
| colspan="11" style="text-align:center;" | 
|-
! rowspan="2" colspan=2 style="background-color:#E9E9E9" align=left|Parties
! rowspan="2" style="background-color:#E9E9E9" align=right|Votes
! rowspan="2" style="background-color:#E9E9E9" align=right|%
! rowspan="2" style="background-color:#E9E9E9" align=right|±pp swing
! colspan="2" style="background-color:#E9E9E9" align="center"|Councillors
|- style="background-color:#E9E9E9"
! style="background-color:#E9E9E9" align="center"|Total
! style="background-color:#E9E9E9" align="center"|±
|-
| 
|73,712||57.79||3.9||9||0
|-
|style="width: 9px" bgcolor= align="center" | 
|align=left|PSD / CDS–PP / PPM
|22,407||17.57||2.7||2||0
|-
| 
|6,162||4.83||0.3||0||0
|-
| 
|5,886||4.61||0.6||0||0
|-
|style="width: 9px" bgcolor=#202056 align="center" | 
|align=left|CHEGA
|5,368||4.21||||0||
|-
|style="width: 9px" bgcolor=#00ADEF align="center" | 
|align=left|Liberal Initiative
|3,760||2.95||||0||
|-
| 
|3,484||2.73||0.1||0||0
|-
|style="width: 9px" bgcolor=black align="center" | 
|align=left|Democratic Republican / Earth
|606||0.48||||0||
|-
| 
|582||0.46||||0||
|-
|colspan=2 width="330" align=left style="background-color:#E9E9E9"|Total valid
|width="50" align="right" style="background-color:#E9E9E9"|121,967
|width="40" align="right" style="background-color:#E9E9E9"|95.63
|width="40" align="right" style="background-color:#E9E9E9"|0.4
|width="40" align="right" style="background-color:#E9E9E9"|11
|width="40" align="right" style="background-color:#E9E9E9"|0
|-
|colspan=2|Blank ballots
|3,562||2.79||0.2||colspan=3 rowspan=4|
|-
|colspan=2|Invalid ballots
|2,017||1.58||0.1
|-
|colspan=2 align=left style="background-color:#E9E9E9"|Total
|width="50" align="right" style="background-color:#E9E9E9"|127,546
|width="40" align="right" style="background-color:#E9E9E9"|100.00
|width="40" align="right" style="background-color:#E9E9E9"|
|-
|colspan=2|Registered voters/turnout
||267,468||47.69||4.4
|-
| colspan=11 align=left | Source: Vila Nova de Gaia 2021 election results
|-
|style="width: 9px" bgcolor= align="center" | 
|colspan="6" align=left| Socialist hold
|}

Vila Real

|-
| colspan="11" style="text-align:center;" | 
|-
! rowspan="2" colspan=2 style="background-color:#E9E9E9" align=left|Parties
! rowspan="2" style="background-color:#E9E9E9" align=right|Votes
! rowspan="2" style="background-color:#E9E9E9" align=right|%
! rowspan="2" style="background-color:#E9E9E9" align=right|±pp swing
! colspan="2" style="background-color:#E9E9E9" align="center"|Councillors
|- style="background-color:#E9E9E9"
! style="background-color:#E9E9E9" align="center"|Total
! style="background-color:#E9E9E9" align="center"|±
|-
| 
|17,472||58.44||6.0||5||2
|-
|style="width: 9px" bgcolor= align="center" |
|align=left|Social Democratic / People's / Alliance
|8,576||28.68||0.4||2||0
|-
|style="width: 9px" bgcolor=#202056 align="center" | 
|align=left|CHEGA
|1,246||4.17||||0||
|-
| 
|802||2.68||1.0||0||0
|-
| 
|633||2.12||0.8||0||0
|-
|colspan=2 width="330" align=left style="background-color:#E9E9E9"|Total valid
|width="50" align="right" style="background-color:#E9E9E9"|28,729
|width="40" align="right" style="background-color:#E9E9E9"|96.09
|width="40" align="right" style="background-color:#E9E9E9"|0.4
|width="40" align="right" style="background-color:#E9E9E9"|7
|width="40" align="right" style="background-color:#E9E9E9"|2
|-
|colspan=2|Blank ballots
|717||2.40||0.5||colspan=3 rowspan=4|
|-
|colspan=2|Invalid ballots
|452||1.51||0.1
|-
|colspan=2 align=left style="background-color:#E9E9E9"|Total
|width="50" align="right" style="background-color:#E9E9E9"|29,898
|width="40" align="right" style="background-color:#E9E9E9"|100.00
|width="40" align="right" style="background-color:#E9E9E9"|
|-
|colspan=2|Registered voters/turnout
||49,701||60.16||1.8
|-
| colspan=11 align=left | Source: Vila Real 2021 election results
|-
|style="width: 9px" bgcolor= align="center" | 
|align="left" colspan="6"|Socialist hold
|}

Viseu

|-
| colspan="11" style="text-align:center;" | 
|-
! rowspan="2" colspan=2 style="background-color:#E9E9E9" align=left|Parties
! rowspan="2" style="background-color:#E9E9E9" align=right|Votes
! rowspan="2" style="background-color:#E9E9E9" align=right|%
! rowspan="2" style="background-color:#E9E9E9" align=right|±pp swing
! colspan="2" style="background-color:#E9E9E9" align="center"|Councillors
|- style="background-color:#E9E9E9"
! style="background-color:#E9E9E9" align="center"|Total
! style="background-color:#E9E9E9" align="center"|±
|-
| 
|24,363||46.68||5.1||5||1
|-
| 
|19,968||38.26||11.8||4||1
|-
|style="width: 9px" bgcolor=#202056 align="center" | 
|align=left|CHEGA
|1,542||2.95||||0||
|-
|style="width: 9px" bgcolor=#00ADEF align="center" | 
|align=left|Liberal Initiative
|1,147||2.20||||0||
|-
|style="width: 9px" bgcolor=#0093DD align="center" | 
|align=left|People's
|1,054||2.02||3.1||0||0
|-
| 
|1,051||2.01||2.8||0||0
|-
| 
|657||1.26||0.9||0||0
|-
| 
|609||1.17||2.7||0||0
|-
|colspan=2 width="330" align=left style="background-color:#E9E9E9"|Total valid
|width="50" align="right" style="background-color:#E9E9E9"|50,391
|width="40" align="right" style="background-color:#E9E9E9"|96.55
|width="40" align="right" style="background-color:#E9E9E9"|2.4
|width="40" align="right" style="background-color:#E9E9E9"|9
|width="40" align="right" style="background-color:#E9E9E9"|0
|-
|colspan=2|Blank ballots
|1,135||2.17||1.4||colspan=3 rowspan=4|
|-
|colspan=2|Invalid ballots
|663||1.27||1.0
|-
|colspan=2 align=left style="background-color:#E9E9E9"|Total
|width="50" align="right" style="background-color:#E9E9E9"|52,189
|width="40" align="right" style="background-color:#E9E9E9"|100.00
|width="40" align="right" style="background-color:#E9E9E9"|
|-
|colspan=2|Registered voters/turnout
||92,444||56.45||5.7
|-
| colspan=11 align=left | Source: Viseu 2021 election results
|-
|style="width: 9px" bgcolor= align="center" | 
|align="left" colspan="6"|Social Democratic hold
|}

External links
Official 2021 Election results

2021 in Portugal
2021
Election results in Portugal